

The National Natural Landmarks in New York include 28 of the almost 600 National Natural Landmarks (NNLs) in the United States. Twenty-six landmarks are contained entirely within New York; the two exceptions are the Palisades of the Hudson which extends along the Hudson River into New Jersey, and the Chazy Fossil Reef which spans several Lake Champlain islands belonging to both New York and Vermont.

New York's NNLs cover unique landforms carved by glacial meltwater, a rare meromictic lake, several exposed fossil sites, and the largest open fault system in the United States. The state's first NNLs, Bergen-Byron Swamp and Mianus River Gorge, were designated in 1964 and are the oldest NNLs in the nation; New York's newest NNL is the Albany Pine Bush, designated in 2014. Owners include private individuals, non-governmental conservation organizations, and several municipal, state and federal agencies. Designation as a NNL does not guarantee that a property is open to the public, and some are located on private property with restricted access.

The National Natural Landmarks Program is administered by the National Park Service, a branch of the Department of the Interior. NNLs are intended to showcase important biological and/or geological features, and represent illustrative or well-preserved examples of such sites within a given biological or physiographic province. Properties considered for NNL status are nominated by the National Park Service, and are accepted or rejected by the Secretary of the Interior after a review process.

The designation provides indirect, partial protection of the historic and biological integrity of the properties via tax incentives, grants, monitoring of threats, and other means. However, designation do never directly prohibit destruction or alteration of the property, and the designation may be revoked at any time by the National Park Service if the NNL is considered to have been significantly altered or damaged. Properties may also be de-designated by request of the property owner.

National Natural Landmarks

Former National Natural Landmark
According to a notice in the Federal Register in July 2006, Gardiner's Island in Suffolk County was removed by the Department of the Interior from National Natural Landmark status in response to owner requests. It was originally designated in April 1967. Its description formerly read: "The island is a breeding ground for osprey and is an important habitat of other fauna, particularly waterfowl and shore birds."

See also 
 List of National Natural Landmarks
 List of National Historic Landmarks in New York

References

External links

 National Park Service: New York National Natural Landmarks

New York
National Natural Landmarks